Frederick Richard Murphy (September 7, 1896 – September 20, 1975) was an Irish-born Canadian professional ice hockey player. He played with the Portland Rosebuds and the Victoria Aristocrats of the Pacific Coast Hockey Association between 1917 and 1920.

During the 1917–18 season Murphy coached the Vancouver Amazons women's team, claiming provincial honors.

During the 1920s, Murphy was also a referee in various senior, intermediate and junior leagues in Vancouver.

References

1896 births
1975 deaths
Canadian ice hockey players
Ice hockey people from British Columbia
Irish emigrants to Canada (before 1923)
People from Coleraine, County Londonderry
Portland Rosebuds players
People from West Vancouver
Victoria Aristocrats players
Sportspeople from County Londonderry